Mount Stevens is a mountain located in Matanuska-Susitna Borough, Alaska. 

The mountain was named in 2010, after Ted Stevens (1923–2010), who had represented Alaska in the U.S. Senate from 1968 to 2009. 
It had been the highest unnamed peak in Alaska, though unofficially called South Hunter Peak.

Mount Stevens stands within the watershed of the Susitna River, which drains into Cook Inlet.
The east sides of Mount Stevens drain into the Tokositna Glacier, thence into the Tokositna River, Chulitna River, and the Susitna. The west sides of Stevens drain into Kahiltna Glacier, thence into Kahiltna River and the Susitna.

Notes 

Alaska Range
Mountains of Alaska
Mountains of Matanuska-Susitna Borough, Alaska
Denali National Park and Preserve